Chemin de fer is a French phrase meaning "railway" or "railroad". Literally, "iron path."

Chemin de fer may refer to:

Arts, entertainment, and media

Literature
Chemin de Fer, a play by Georges Feydeau (1862–1921)
"Chemin de Fer", a poem by Elizabeth Bishop (1911–1979) from North and South

Music
 Étude aux chemins de fer, a 1948 composition by Pierre Schaeffer constructed from railway sounds
 Le chemin de fer (Alkan), Op. 27, an 1844 étude composed by Charles-Valentin Alkan

Other uses in arts, entertainment, and media
 Chemin-de-fer, the original version of the card game baccarat when it was introduced to France
 The Railway (French: Le Chemin de fer), an 1873 painting by French artist Édouard Manet

Other uses
 Chemin de Fer, a 1970-80's clothing line

See also
 
 
 
 
Chemin (disambiguation)
Le chemin (disambiguation)